Dehnow-ye Fatemeh Barat (also Romanized as Dehnow-ye Fāţemeh Barāt) is a village in Golshan Rural District, in the Central District of Tabas County, South Khorasan Province, Iran. At the 2006 census, its population was 90, in 24 families.

References 

Populated places in Tabas County